Commersonia dasyphylla, commonly known as kerrawang, is a species of flowering plant of the family Malvaceae and is endemic to eastern continental Australia. It is a shrub with egg-shaped to lance-shaped with irregular edges and flowers in groups of up to 21, followed by hairy brown capsules.

Description
Kerrawang grows as a shrub reaching  in height with its stems covered in fine hairs. The upper surface of the leaves is hairy and the lower surface is densely covered with white, star-shaped hairs. Flowering occurs from September to January and the flowers are followed by hairy brown capsules  in diameter.

Commersonia dasyphylla is very similar to C. breviseta and C. rugosa and is difficult to distinguish without fruit, other than from the structure of the star-shaped flowers on the lower leaf surface.

Taxonomy
Commersonia dasyphylla was initially described in 1810 by Henry Cranke Andrews in his book The Botanist's Repository for New, and Rare Plants. It was then placed in the genus Rulingia by Robert Sweet in 1826 where it remained until its original name was restored in 2011. The genus name commemorates 18th-century French naturalist Philibert Commerson, while the species name is derived from Ancient Greek dasys "hairy" and phyllon "leaf", and refers to cottonlike hairs covering the leaves.

Range and ecology
The range is across eastern Australia from southeastern Queensland through New South Wales and into eastern Victoria, the preferred habitat is gullies in forested areas. Flies are the likely most common pollinators, and native bees, beetles, and diurnal moths may do so as well. The kerrawang is killed by bushfire and regenerates from seed.

Conservation status
In Victoria, the species is listed as "threatened" under the Flora and Fauna Guarantee Act 1988 and  "vulnerable" on the Department of Sustainability and Environment's Advisory List of Rare Or Threatened Plants in Victoria.

Uses
Its fibres were used for basket making by the local Cadigal people of Sydney. The kerrawang, an Australian shrub, should not be confused with the kurrajong, an Australian tree whose bark is used to make twine.

First cultivated in England in 1819 as Rulingia pannosa, the kerrawang is a fast-growing and ornamental shrub. It prefers semishaded areas with fair drainage and mildly acid soil. It seeds readily, and can be easily propagated from seed or cuttings.

References

External links
 An image of the kerrawang among other plants at Australian-Insects.com

dasyphylla
Flora of New South Wales
Flora of Queensland
Flora of Victoria (Australia)
Taxa named by Henry Cranke Andrews
Plants described in 1810